Terry Fell (May 13, 1921 – April 4, 2007) was an American country musician.

Biography

Childhood and adolescence
Fell was born in Dora, Alabama on May 13, 1921, and got his first guitar at the age of nine. Later, he learned mandolin and took singing lessons. When he was 13 years old, his father died; three years later, he moved alone to California, where he spent some time in a camp of the Civilian Conservation Corps. After he briefly lived in Alabama again, Fell and his mother moved to the US West Coast. There, he began playing in 1943 as bassist for Merl Lindsay.

Musical career

Fell started his record career in 1945 as a member of Billy Hughes' band, Pals of The Pecos. His first record was with Hughes on the Fargo label. He began his solo career with Memo, then Courtney, 4 Star, and Gilt-Edge Records, although none of his releases became hits there.

During his first session for RCA in Hollywood (1954), he recorded a song that would become a hit. Although the A-side, "Don't Drop It", was underplayed, the B-side, "Truck Drivin Man", became a classic, especially in the trucker country-music scene. In 1955, he made a guest appearance on ABC-TV's Ozark Jubilee.

Fell remained with RCA for the following two years; however, he never produced a single with the same success. RCA extended his contract in 1956.

In 1958, he recorded some sides for Lode records.  One of them, released under the name "Johnny Valentine," was a song he wrote called "Sandy" which became a No. 15 pop hit for Larry Hall in 1960.

In 1959, he began military service in the U.S. Army and was stationed in West Germany. Along with Elvis Presley, who was at the same time a G.I. stationed in West Germany, he wrote the song "Mississippi River". The single was never released, but the rights were later sold for $30,000 in 1996.

Due to the lack of success and health problems, his career fell short. Later, for a short time, he managed country star Buck Owens and wrote a song in 1961 with Bobby Edwards titled "You're The Reason". In 1962, Fell moved to Nashville, Tennessee, where he was a songwriter for various publishing companies until he retired. Published in 1993 with Bear Family Records, the album Truck Drivin Man was released with his collected RCA works. Terry Gordon noted that it was discontinued in 1998, but revised/reissued again. Because of his achievements in country music, he was inducted into the Alabama Music Hall of Fame.

Fell died on April 4, 2007, in Madison, Tennessee.

Discography

He wrote and recorded a novelty record on the Lode label under the name Brother George Underbrush, called "Green Garden Hose". It was divided into two parts, one on each side. He later released a cassette on Lode that contained several more of his strange musings.

Singles
All of the Memo, 4 Star, Gilt-Edge, and "X"/RCA singles were published under the name 'Terry Fell & The Fellers'.

Albums/CDs 
 Truck Driving Man (Bear Family BCD 15762, 1993) all RCA material
 Get Aboard My Wagon (B.A.C.M. CDD 191, 2007) Memo/Gilt-Edge/RCA material
 Ramblin' Oakie (B.A.C.M. CDD 333, 2011) Fargo/Courtney/4 Star material

References

Further reading
 Biography of Terry Fell from rockabilly.nl
 Biography from the Alabama Music Office
 Alabama Music History Blog: "Dora Native Terry Fell"
 "Terry Fell, Forgotten Father of Trucker Music"

1921 births
2007 deaths
American country singer-songwriters
Country musicians from Alabama
People from Walker County, Alabama
Crest Records artists
20th-century American singers
Singer-songwriters from Alabama